Imoru Salifu  was a Ghanaian politician and founding member of the Northern People's Party.

References

People from Upper East Region
Northern People's Party politicians